Turkovsky District is an administrative and municipal district (raion), one of the thirty-eight in Saratov Oblast, Russia. It is located in the northwest of the oblast. Its administrative center is the urban locality (a work settlement) of Turki. Population: 12,834 (2010 Census);  The population of Turki accounts for 47.7% of the district's total population.

References

Notes

Sources

Districts of Saratov Oblast